Felix McBrearty is a former Northern Irish professional darts player who has played in the Professional Darts Corporation (PDC) events.

Career

McBrearty began playing in PDC ranked event in 2004, playing mainly in irish tournaments . McBrearty caused a major surprise by winning the Ireland Open Autumn Classic, beating Tony Ayres, Kevin McDine, Colin Osborne, Michael van Gerwen, Andy Hamilton and Colin Lloyd before defeating Chris Mason in the final to win the £5,000 top prize. His win earned him a place in the 2008 World Grand Prix where he lost in the first round to Wayne Mardle.

McBrearty continued his good form by reaching the quarter finals of the 2008 Killarney Pro Tour where he lost to the eventual winner Terry Jenkins. His performances earned him a spot in the 2009 PDC World Darts Championship and the 2009 Players Championship Finals. At the World Championship, Barrie Bates beat McBrearty 3-0, while at the Players Championship Finals, he lost 6-2 to world number six Mervyn King.

World Championship Results

PDC
 2009: 1st Round: (lost to Barrie Bates 0-3)

External links
Profile and stats on Darts Database 

Living people
Year of birth missing (living people)
Darts players from Northern Ireland
Professional Darts Corporation associate players
PDC ranking title winners
Irish darts players